The Mississippi U.S. House elections took place on November 7, 2006.  All 4 House seats for Mississippi were up for election with all incumbents (2 Republicans and 2 Democrats) running for re-election.  All incumbents succeeded in being re-elected.

Overview

District 1 

Incumbent Roger Wicker (R) faced political consultant Ken Hurt (D).  Wicker has represented the conservative northern Mississippi district since 1995 and has been easily re-elected since.  Hurt won a plurality in the Democratic Primary on June 7, but since he did not win over 50% of the vote, he was forced into a run-off with Bill Bambach, the second highest vote winner.
CQ Politics rating: Safe Republican.

District 2 

Congressman Bennie Thompson (D) competed against Tchula mayor Yvonne Brown (R).  The Democratic-leaning majority-black district comprises the Mississippi Delta and Jackson, the capital and largest city in Mississippi.  Thompson first won in a special election in 1993 caused by then-Representative Mike Espy resigning to become Secretary of Agriculture under President Clinton.  The congressman had generally easy elections except in 2002 when Republican and political newcomer Clinton LeSueur won 44% of the vote. And in that race state representative Chuck Espy (nephew of Mike Espy) competed against Thompson for the Democratic nomination, though Thompson won with 65% to Espy's 35%.

Yvonne Brown was nominated by the Republicans without any primary opposition.  She was elected mayor of the small Delta town of Tchula in 2001 and re-elected in 2005, which is notable in that she is a black Republican in a very Democratic area. 
CQ Politics rating: Safe Democrat.

District 3 

In a repeat of the 2004 race, Republican incumbent Charles "Chip" Pickering, Jr. had no Democratic challenger, but faced independent Jim Giles and Reform Party candidate Lamonica Magee.  This Republican-leaning district starts in the lower western part of the state and goes through the Jackson suburbs and up to east central Mississippi.  Pickering was first elected in 1996 after the retirement of long-time incumbent Sonny Montgomery (D). The only strong challenge he has faced so far was in 2002 when re-apportionment caused Mississippi to lose a House seat. Pickering was pitted against Democrat Ronnie Shows, the two-term incumbent in the old 4th District; Pickering won with over 60% of the vote.  The only candidates running against him this year are independent candidate Jim Giles, an organic farmer and ex-systems engineer known for his white supremacist views, and Reform Party candidate Lamonica Magee.
CQ Politics rating: Safe Republican.

District 4 

Democrat Gene Taylor, the incumbent, faced Republican Randall McDonnell.  This district, heavily devastated by Hurricane Katrina, covers the Mississippi Gulf Coast and inland areas directly north of it.  While the district leans Republican, conservative Democrat Taylor has comfortably won since winning in a 1989 special election caused by the death of freshman congressman Larkin Smith (R).  McDonnell is an accountant and ran against Taylor in 1998 and 2000.
CQ Politics rating: Safe Democrat.

References 

Mississippi

2006 2
2006 Mississippi elections